Calathus reflexus is a species of ground beetle from the Platyninae subfamily that can be found on Cyprus and in the Near East.

References

reflexus
Beetles described in 1858
Beetles of Europe
Taxa named by Hermann Rudolph Schaum